Flamborough is a village and civil parish in the East Riding of Yorkshire, England.

The most prominent man-made feature of the area is Flamborough Head Lighthouse. For information about its founding, see Thorgils Skarthi.

According to the 2011 UK Census, Flamborough parish had a population of 2,161, an increase on the 2001 UK Census figure of 2,121.

The church of St Oswald stands in the village and was designated a Grade II* listed building in 1966 and is now recorded in the National Heritage List for England, maintained by Historic England. The village centre contains a number of shops and public houses. The Royal Dog and Duck is at Dog and Duck Square.

In the village are the fragmentary remains of Flamborough Castle, a medieval fortified manor house.

In 1823 the village was a parish in the Wapentake of Dickering. Flamborough was recorded as "merely a fishing village" with a "very ancient station, formerly of some note". The population at the time was 917, half of which constituted the families of fishermen. Occupations included eleven farmers, two blacksmiths, two butchers, two grocers, seven carpenters, four shoemakers, three tailors, a stonemason & flour dealer, a bacon & flour dealer, a weaver, a corn miller, a straw hat manufacturer, and the landlords of the Sloop, the Board and the Dog and Duck public houses. Also listed was a schoolmaster and a gentlewoman. Four carriers operated in the village, destinations being Hull and York twice a week, and Bridlington, daily. With St Oswald's Church was a Methodist and a Primitive Methodist chapel.

Between 1894 and 1974 Flamborough was a part of the Bridlington Rural District, in the East Riding of Yorkshire. Between 1974 and 1996 it was part of the Borough of North Wolds (later Borough of East Yorkshire), in the county of Humberside.

According to local legend, the village is haunted by the ghost of a suicide known as Jenny Gallows.

Flamborough, with its holiday camps and a caravan park, is a holiday destination during the summer months. The village holds an annual Fire Festival on New Year's Eve which in 2017 attracted 5,000 people.

In 2016 North Landing was used in the filming of the Dads Army film

In 2018 the beach at Flamborough was used in the filming of the ITV drama Victoria.

See also
 Flamborough Lifeboat Station

References

External links 

Flamborough Parish Council Website
East Riding website
Local Author
Flamborough Information

Flamborough
Villages in the East Riding of Yorkshire
Civil parishes in the East Riding of Yorkshire